Guam High School (GHS or GMHS)  is a U.S. military operated secondary school located at 401 Stitt Street in Agana Heights in the United States territory of Guam.

The school, a part of the Department of Defense Education Activity, serves over 500 students grades 9 through 12. The school serves children of military personnel stationed in Guam.  Staff includes forty-six teachers and two administrators.  The principal is Katrina Watts.

In September 1997 the DoDEA opened its own schools for children of military personnel. It is within the Naval Hospital census-designated place, defined by the U.S. Census Bureau.

School uniforms
Like other Department of Defense Education Activity schools on Guam, Guam High School requires school uniforms. Uniforms consist of navy blue, white or black golf shirts and oxford shirts, as well as khaki trousers, skirts, and shorts. DODEA Pacific officials began implementing uniforms at the schools in the northern hemisphere fall of 2007; students received a period to adjust, then uniforms became mandatory in January 2008.

Athletics
Athletic activities at the school include:
 Baseball
 Basketball
 Cheerleading
 Cross country
 American football
 Soccer (football)
 Golf
 Paddling
 Rugby
 Softball
 Tennis
 Track and Field
 Volleyball
 Wrestling

Other organizations and programs
Other organizations and programs include:
 Journalism
 Navy Junior Reserve Officer Training Corps (NJROTC)
 Junior Science and Humanities Symposium (JSHS)
 A theatre program
 A school wide CCTV morning broadcast under the name of Panther News Network (PNN)
 Student Government & Class Councils

References

External links

Guam High School

Public high schools in Guam
Agana Heights, Guam